Punjab is a province of Pakistan. Located in central-eastern region of the country, Punjab is the second-largest province of Pakistan by land area and the largest province by population. It is bordered by the Pakistani provinces of Khyber Pakhtunkhwa to the north-west, Balochistan to the south-west and Sindh to the south, as well as Islamabad Capital Territory to the north-west and Autonomous state of AJK to the north. It shares an International border with the Indian states of Rajasthan and Punjab to the east and Indian-administered Kashmir to the north-east. Punjab is the most fertile province of the country as River Indus and its four major tributaries Ravi, Jhelum, Chenab and Sutlej flow through it.

The province forms the bulk of the transnational Punjab region, now divided among Pakistan and India. The provincial capital is Lahore — a cultural, modern, historical, economic, and cosmopolitan centre of Pakistan. Other major cities include Faisalabad, Rawalpindi, Gujranwala, Sialkot, and Multan- the historic capital of the region. Punjab is also the world's fifth-most populous subnational entity, and the most populous outside of China and India.

Punjab is Pakistan's most industrialized province, with the industrial sector comprising 24 percent of the province's gross domestic product. It is known across Pakistan for its relative prosperity, and has the lowest rate of poverty among all Pakistani provinces. However, a clear divide is present between the northern and southern portions of the province; with poverty rates in northern Punjab being among the lowest in Pakistan, while some in southern Punjab are among the most impoverished. Punjab is also one of the most urbanized regions of South Asia, with approximately 40 percent of its population being concentrated in urban areas.
 
It has been strongly influenced by Sufism, with numerous Sufi shrines spread across the province, attracting millions of devotees annually. Guru Nanak, the founder of Sikhism, was born in the town of Nankana Sahib, near Lahore. Punjab is also the site of the Katas Raj Temples, which feature prominently in Hindu mythology. Several of the World Heritage Sites listed by UNESCO are located in Punjab, including the Shalimar Gardens, the Lahore Fort, the archaeological excavations at Taxila, and the Rohtas Fort, among others.

Etymology
The word pañjāb thus means 'The Land of Five Waters', referring to the rivers Jhelum, Chenab, Ravi, Sutlej, and Beas. All are tributaries of the Indus River, the Sutlej being the largest. References to a land of five rivers may be found in the Mahabharata, which calls one of the regions in ancient Bharat  Panchanada. Persian place names are very common in Northwest India and Pakistan. The ancient Greeks referred to the region as Pentapotamía, which has the same meaning as the Persian word.

History

Ancient period 
The Punjab region is noted as the site of one of the earliest urban societies, the Indus Valley Civilization that flourished from about 3000 B.C. and declined rapidly 1,000 years later, following the Indo-Aryan migrations that overran the region in waves between 1500 and 500 B.C. Frequent intertribal wars stimulated the growth of larger groupings ruled by chieftains and kings, who ruled local kingdoms known as Mahajanapadas. The rise of kingdoms and dynasties in the Punjab is chronicled in the ancient Hindu epics, particularly the Mahabharata.

Multan was the noted centre of excellence of the region which was attacked by Greek army led by Alexander the great. The Mali tribe together with nearby tribes gathered an army of 90,000 personnel to face Greek army. This was the largest army faced by Greeks in entire subcontinent. During the siege of the city's citadel, the Alexander leaped into the inner area of the citadel, where he killed the Mallians' leader. Alexander was wounded by an arrow that had penetrated his lung, leaving him severely injured.   The city was conquered after a fierce battle.

In 326 B.C. The earliest known notable local king of this region was known as Porus, who fought the famous Battle of the Hydaspes against Alexander the Great. His kingdom spanned between rivers Hydaspes (Jhelum) and Acesines (Chenab); Strabo had held the territory to contain almost 300 cities. He (alongside Abisares) had a hostile relationship with the Kingdom of Taxila which was ruled by his extended family. When the armies of Alexander crossed Indus in its eastward migration, probably in Udabhandapura, he was greeted by the-then ruler of Taxila, Omphis and was immediately surrendered to him without a battle.  

Omphis had hoped to force both Porus and Abisares into submission leveraging the might of Alexander's forces and diplomatic missions were mounted, but while Abisares accepted the submission, Porus refused. This led Alexander to seek for a face-off with Porus. Thus began the Battle of the Hydaspes in 326 BC; the exact site remains unknown. The battle is thought to be resulted in a decisive Greek victory; however, A. B. Bosworth warns against an uncritical reading of Greek sources who were obviously exaggerative. Alexander later founded two cities—Nicaea at the site of victory and Bucephalous at the battle-ground, in memory of his horse, who died soon after the battle. Later, tetradrachms would be minted depicting Alexander on horseback, armed with a sarissa and attacking a pair of Indians on an elephant. Porus refused to surrender and wandered about atop an elephant, until he was wounded and his force routed. When asked by Alexander how he wished to be treated, Porus replied "Treat me as a king would treat another king". Despite the apparently one-sided results, Alexander was impressed by Porus and chose to not depose him. Not only was his territory reinstated but also expanded with Alexander's forces annexing the territories of Glausaes, who ruled to the northeast of Porus' kingdom. After Alexander's death in 323 BCE, Perdiccas became the regent of his empire, and after Perdiccas's murder in 321 BCE, Antipater became the new regent. According to Diodorus, Antipater recognized Porus's authority over the territories along the Indus River. However, Eudemus, who had served as Alexander's satrap in the Punjab region, treacherously killed Porus. The battle is historically significant because it resulted in the syncretism of ancient Greek political and cultural influences to the Indian subcontinent, yielding works such as Greco-Buddhist art, which continued to have an impact for the ensuing centuries. The region was then divided between the Maurya Empire and the Greco-Bactrian kingdom in 302 B.C.E. Menander I Soter conquered Punjab and made Sagala (present-day Sialkot) the capital of the Indo-Greek Kingdom. Menander is noted for having become a patron and convert to Greco-Buddhism and he is widely regarded as the greatest of the Indo-Greek kings. Greek influence in the region ended around 12 B.C.E. when the Punjab fell under the Sassanids.

Medieval period 
Islam emerged as the major power in Punjab after the Umayyad caliphate led by Muhammad bin Qasim conquered the region in 711 AD. The city of Multan became a center of the Ismaili sect of Islam. Umayyads after conquering key cities of Uch and Multan inhabited thousands of Arabs (10,000) in Multan, These Arabs ruled the vast areas of Punjab for next 3 centuries. From their capital in Multan they ruled the far areas of Kashmir. Islam spread rapidly.

In the ninth century, the Hindu Shahi dynasty originating from the region of Oddiyana replaced the Taank kingdom in the Punjab, ruling much of Punjab along with eastern Afghanistan. In the 10th century, the tribe of the Gakhars/Khokhars, formed a large part of the Hindu Shahi army according to the Persian historian Firishta.

Ghaznavid

The Turkic Ghaznavids in the tenth century attacked the regions of Punjab. Multan and Uch were conquered after 3 attacks and Multan's Arab ruler Abul Fateh Daud was defeated, thousands of Ismailis were killed or mutilated according to 11th century scholar Abu Mansur al-Baghdadi, though the community was not extinguished, famous Sun Temple was destroyed. This ended the 3 centuries Arab rule over Punjab. Ghaznavids overthrew the Hindu Shahis and consequently ruled for 157 years, gradually declining as a power until the Ghurid conquests of key Punjab cities of Uch, Multan and Lahore by Muhammad of Ghor in 1186, deposing the last Ghaznavid ruler Khusrau Malik.

Following the death of Muhammad of Ghor in 1206, the Ghurid state fragmented and was replaced in northern India by the Delhi Sultanate and for some time independent sultanates ruled by various Sultans. The Delhi Sultanate ruled the Punjab for the next three hundred years, led by five unrelated dynasties, the Mamluks, Khalajis, Tughlaqs, Sayyids and Lodis.

Tughlaq

Ghiyath al Din Tughlaq, the former governor of Multan and Dipalpur founded Tughlaq dynasty in Delhi and ruled the subcontinent region . Earlier he served as the governor of Multan and fought 28 battles against Mongols from there and saved Punjab and Sindh regions from advances of Mongols and had survived. After his death his son Muhammad Tughlaq became the emperor.

Mongol invasion
15th century saw rise of many prominent Muslims from Punjab. Khizr Khan established the Sayyid dynasty, the fourth dynasty of the Delhi Sultanate after the fall of the Tughlaqs.In 1398, Timur attacked the Punjab region. After his invasion, Khizr Khan established the fourth dynasty of the Delhi Sultanate. According to Richard M. Eaton, Khizr Khan was son of a Punjabi chieftain. He was a Khokhar chieftain who travelled to Samarkand and profited from the contacts he made with the Timurid society Later on, Delhi Sultanate, weakened by invasion of Emir Timur, could not control all regions of the Empire and different local kingdoms appeared.

Langah Sultanate 

In 1445, Sultan Qutbudin, chief of Langah, a Jat Zamindar tribe established the Langah Sultanate in Multan. The Sultanate included regions of southern and central Punjab and areas of Khyber and Balochistan. A large number of Baloch settlers arrived and towns of Dera Ghazi Khan and Dera Ismail Khan were  founded.

During the most of 15th century, the Khokhars and Gakhars tribe were in general revolt in the Pothohar region. 
Jasrath Khokhar was one of their major chiefs who helped Sultan Zain Ul Abideen of Kashmir to gain his throne and ruled over vast tracts of Jammu and North Punjab. He also conquered Delhi for a brief period in 1431 but was driven out by Mubarak Shah.

Modern period 

The Mughals came to power in the early sixteenth century and gradually expanded to control all of the Punjab. During Mughal period Punjab region was divided into two provinces; Subah of Multan and Subah of Lahore. The Mughal Empire ruled the region until it was severely weakened in the eighteenth century. As Mughal power weakened, Afghan rulers took control of the region. Contested by Marathas and Afghans, the region was the center of the growing influence of the Sikhs, who expanded and established the Sikh empire as the Mughals and Afghans weakened, ultimately ruling the Punjab and territories north into the Himalayas.

The Sikh Empire ruled the Punjab until the British annexed it in 1849 following the First and Second Anglo-Sikh Wars.

British Rule

Most of the Punjabi homeland formed a province of British India, though a number of small princely states retained local rulers who recognized British authority. The Punjab with its rich farmlands became one of the most important colonial assets. Lahore was a noted center of learning and culture, and Rawalpindi became an important military installation. 

Most Punjabis supported the British during World War I, providing men and resources to the war effort even though the Punjab remained a source of anti colonial activities. Disturbances in the region increased as the war continued. At the end of the war, high casualty rates, heavy taxation, inflation, and a widespread influenza epidemic disrupted Punjabi society. In 1919 a British officer ordered his troops to fire on a crowd of demonstrators, mostly Sikhs in Amritsar. The Jallianwala massacre fueled the indian independence movement. Nationalists declared the independence of India from Lahore in 1930 but were quickly suppressed.

When the Second World War broke out, nationalism in British India had already divided into religious movements. Many Sikhs and other minorities supported the Hindus, who promised a secular multicultural and multireligious society, and Muslim leaders in Lahore passed a resolution to work for a Muslim Pakistan, making the Punjab region a center of growing conflict between Indian and Pakistani nationalists. At the end of the war, the British granted separate independence to India and Pakistan, setting off massive communal violence as Muslims fled to Pakistan and Hindu and Sikh Punjabis fled east to India.

The British Raj had major political, cultural, philosophical, and literary consequences in the Punjab, including the establishment of a new system of education. During the independence movement, many Punjabis played a significant role, including Madan Lal Dhingra, Sukhdev Thapar, Ajit Singh Sandhu, Bhagat Singh, Udham Singh, Kartar Singh Sarabha, Bhai Parmanand, Choudhry Rahmat Ali, and Lala Lajpat Rai. At the time of partition in 1947, the province was split into East and West Punjab. East Punjab (48%) became part of India, while West Punjab (52%) became part of Pakistan. The Punjab bore the brunt of the civil unrest following partition, with casualties estimated to be in the millions.

Another major consequence of partition was the sudden shift towards religious homogeneity occurred in all districts across Punjab owing to the new international border that cut through the province. This rapid demographic shift was primarily due to wide scale migration but also caused by large-scale religious cleansing riots which were witnessed across the region at the time. According to historical demographer Tim Dyson, in the eastern regions of Punjab that ultimately became Indian Punjab following independence, districts that were 66% Hindu in 1941 became 80% Hindu in 1951; those that were 20% Sikh became 50% Sikh in 1951. Conversely, in the western regions of Punjab that ultimately became Pakistani Punjab, all districts became almost exclusively Muslim by 1951.

Geography
It occupies 25.8% of the total landmass of Pakistan. Punjab province is bordered by Sindh to the south, the province of Balochistan to the southwest, the province of Khyber Pakhtunkhwa to the west, and the Islamabad Capital Territory and Azad Kashmir in the north. Punjab borders Jammu and Kashmir in the north, and the Indian states of Punjab and Rajasthan to the east.

The capital and largest city is Lahore which was the capital of the wider Punjab region since 17th century. Other important cities include Faisalabad, Rawalpindi, Gujranwala, Sargodha, Multan, Sialkot, Bahawalpur, Gujrat, Sheikhupura, Jhelum and Sahiwal. The undivided Punjab region was home to six rivers, of which five flow through Pakistan's Punjab province. From west to east, the rivers are: the Indus, Jhelum, Chenab, Ravi and Sutlej. It is the nation's only province that touches every other province; it also surrounds the federal enclave of the national capital city at Islamabad.

Topography

Punjab's landscape consists mostly consists of fertile alluvial plains of the Indus River and its four major tributaries in Pakistan, the Jhelum, Chenab, Ravi, and Sutlej rivers which traverse Punjab north to south – the fifth of the "five waters" of Punjab, the Beas River, lies exclusively in the Indian state of Punjab. The landscape is amongst the most heavily irrigated on earth and canals can be found throughout the province. Punjab also includes several mountainous regions, including the Sulaiman Mountains in the southwest part of the province, the Margalla Hills in the north near Islamabad, and the Salt Range which divides the most northerly portion of Punjab, the Pothohar Plateau, from the rest of the province. Sparse deserts can be found in southern Punjab near the border with Rajasthan and near the Sulaiman Range. Punjab also contains part of the Thal and Cholistan deserts. In the South, Punjab's elevation reaches  near the hill station of Fort Munro in Dera Ghazi Khan.

Climate

Most areas in Punjab experience extreme weather with foggy winters, often accompanied by rain. By mid-February the temperature begins to rise; springtime weather continues until mid-April, when the summer heat sets in.
The onset of the southwest monsoon is anticipated to reach Punjab by May, but since the early 1970s, the weather pattern has been irregular. The spring monsoon has either skipped over the area or has caused it to rain so hard that floods have resulted. June and July are oppressively hot. Although official estimates rarely place the temperature above 46 °C, newspaper sources claim that it reaches 51 °C and regularly carry reports about people who have succumbed to the heat. Heat records were broken in Multan in June 1993, when the mercury was reported to have risen to 54 °C. In August the oppressive heat is punctuated by the rainy season, referred to as barsat, which brings relief in its wake. The hardest part of the summer is then over, but cooler weather does not come until late October.

Recently the province experienced one of the coldest winters in the last 70 years.

Punjab's region temperature ranges from −2° to 45 °C, but can reach 50 °C (122 °F) in summer and can touch down to −10 °C in winter.

Climatically, Punjab has three major seasons:

 Rainy season (July to September). Average rainfall annual ranges between 96 cm sub-mountain region and 46 cm in the plains.
 Cold / Foggy / mild weather (October to March).

Weather extremes are notable from the hot and barren south to the cool hills of the north. The foothills of the Himalayas are found in the extreme north as well, and feature a much cooler and wetter climate, with snowfall common at higher altitudes.

Demographics

Population 
The province is home to over half the population of Pakistan, and is the world's fifth-most populous subnational entity, and the most populous outside China or India.

Religions 

According to the 2017 census, the population of Punjab, Pakistan is was 109,989,655. With 107,541,602 adherents, Muslims comprise the largest religious group, with a Sunni Hanafi majority and a Shia Ithna 'ashariyah minority, forming approximately 97.8 percent of the population. The largest non-Muslim minority is Christians with 2,063,063 adherents, forming roughly 1.9 percent of the population. Hindus form 211,641 people, comprising approximately 0.2 percent of the population. The other minorities include Sikhs, Parsis and Baháʼís.

Languages 

The major native language spoken in the Punjab is Punjabi, representing the largest language spoken in the country. Punjabi is recognized as the provincial language of Punjab but is not given any official recognition in the Constitution of Pakistan at the national level.

Several languages closely related to Punjabi are spoken in the periphery of the region. In the southern half of Punjab, the majority language is Saraiki, while in the north there are speakers of Hindko and Pothwari. Pashto is also spoken in some parts of Punjab, especially in Attock, Mianwali and Rawalpindi districts.

Provincial government

The Government of Punjab is a provincial government in the federal structure of Pakistan, is based in Lahore, the capital of the Punjab Province. The Chief Minister of Punjab (CM) is elected by the Provincial Assembly of the Punjab to serve as the head of the provincial government in Punjab, Pakistan. The current Chief Minister is Chaudhry Pervaiz Elahi He got elected by the National Assembly on 26 July 2022. The Provincial Assembly of the Punjab is a unicameral legislature of elected representatives of the province of Punjab, which is located in Lahore in eastern Pakistan. The Assembly was established under Article 106 of the Constitution of Pakistan as having a total of 371 seats, with 66 seats reserved for women and eight reserved for non-Muslims.

There are 48 departments in Punjab government. Each Department is headed by a Provincial Minister (Politician) and a Provincial Secretary (A civil servant of usually BPS-20 or BPS-21). All Ministers report to the Chief Minister, who is the Chief Executive. All Secretaries report to the Chief Secretary of Punjab, who is usually a BPS-22 Civil Servant. The Chief Secretary in turn, reports to the Chief Minister. In addition to these departments, there are several Autonomous Bodies and Attached Departments that report directly to either the Secretaries or the Chief Secretary.

Divisions

Districts

Major cities

Economy

Punjab has the largest economy in Pakistan, contributing most to the national GDP. The province's economy has quadrupled since 1972. Its share of Pakistan's GDP was 54.7% in 2000 and 59% as of 2010. It is especially dominant in the service and agriculture sectors of Pakistan's economy. With its contribution ranging from 52.1% to 64.5% in the Service Sector and 56.1% to 61.5% in the agriculture sector. It is also a major manpower contributor because it has the largest pool of professionals and highly skilled (technically trained) manpower in Pakistan. It is also dominant in the manufacturing sector, though the dominance is not as huge, with historical contributions ranging from a low of 44% to a high of 52.6%. In 2007, Punjab achieved a growth rate of 7.8% and during the period 2002–03 to 2007–08, its economy grew at a rate of between 7% to 8% per year. and during 2008–09 grew at 6% against the total GDP growth of Pakistan at 4%.

Despite the lack of a coastline, Punjab is the most industrialised province of Pakistan; its manufacturing industries produce textiles, sports goods, heavy machinery, electrical appliances, surgical instruments, vehicles, auto parts, metals, sugar mill plants, aircraft, cement, agricultural machinery, bicycles and rickshaws, floor coverings, and processed foods. In 2003, the province manufactured 90% of the paper and paper boards, 71% of the fertilizers, 69% of the sugar and 40% of the cement of Pakistan.

Lahore and Gujranwala Divisions have the largest concentration of small light engineering units. The district of Sialkot excels in sports goods, surgical instruments and cutlery goods. Industrial estates are being developed by Punjab government to boost industrialization in province, Quaid e Azam Business Park Sheikhupura is one of the industrial area which is being developed near Sheikhupura on Lahore-Islamabad motorway.

Punjab has the lowest poverty rates in Pakistan, although a divide is present between the northern and southern parts of the province. Sialkot District in the prosperous northern part of the province has a poverty rate of 5.63%, while Rajanpur District in the poorer south has a poverty rate of 60.05%.

Education

The literacy rate has increased greatly over the last 40 years (see the table below). Punjab has the highest Human Development Index out of all of Pakistan's provinces at 0.564.

Sources:

This is a chart of the education market of Punjab estimated by the government in 1998.

List of universities

Culture

The culture in Punjab grew out of the settlements along the five rivers, which served as an important route to the Near East as early as the ancient Indus Valley civilization, dating back to 3000 BCE. Agriculture has been the major economic feature of the Punjab and has therefore formed the foundation of Punjabi culture, with one's social status being determined by landownership. The Punjab emerged as an important agricultural region, especially following the Green Revolution during the mid-1960's to the mid-1970's, has been described as the "breadbasket of both India and Pakistan".

Fairs and festivals 
The Islamic festivals are typically observed. Non-Islamic festivals include Lohri, Basant and Vaisakhi, which are usually celebrated as seasonal festivals. The Islamic festivals are set according to the lunar Islamic calendar (Hijri), and the date falls earlier by 10 to 13 days from year to year.

Some Islamic clerics and some politicians have attempted to ban the participation of non-Islamic festivals because of the religious basis, and they being declared haram (forbidden in Islam).

Tourism 

Tourism in Punjab is regulated by the Tourism Development Corporation of Punjab. The province has a number of large cosmopolitan cities, including the provincial capital Lahore. Major visitor attractions there include Lahore Fort and Shalimar Gardens, which are now recognised World Heritage Sites. The Walled City of Lahore, Badshahi Mosque, Wazir Khan Mosque, Tomb of Jahangir and Nur Jahan, Tomb of Asaf Khan, Chauburji and other major sites visited by tourists each year.

Murree is a famous hill station stop for tourists. The Pharwala Fort, which was built by an ancient Hindu civilisation, is on the outskirts of the city. The city of Sheikhupura also has a number of sites from the Mughal Empire, including the World Heritage-listed Rohtas Fort near Jhelum. The Katasraj temple in the city of Chakwal is a major destination for Hindu devotees. The Khewra Salt Mines is one of the oldest mines in South Asia. Faisalabad's clock tower and eight bazaars were designed to represent the Union Jack.

The province's southward is arid. Multan is known for its mausoleums of saints and Sufi pirs. The Multan Museum, Multan fort, DHA 360° zoo and Nuagaza tombs are significant attractions in the city. The city of Bahawalpur is located near the Cholistan and Thar deserts. Derawar Fort in the Cholistan Desert is the site for the annual Cholistan Jeep Rally. The city is also near the ancient site of Uch Sharif which was once a Delhi Sultanate stronghold. The Noor Mahal, Sadiq Ghar Palace, Darbar Mall were built during the reign of the Nawabs. The Lal Suhanra National Park is a major zoological garden on the outskirts of the city.

Social issues
The use of Urdu and English as the near exclusive languages of broadcasting, the public sector, and formal education have led some to fear that the Punjabi language in the province is being relegated to a low-status language and that it is being denied an environment where it can flourish. 

In August 2015, the Pakistan Academy of Letters, International Writer's Council (IWC) and World Punjabi Congress (WPC) organised the Khawaja Farid Conference and demanded that a Punjabi-language university should be established in Lahore and that Punjabi language should be declared as the medium of instruction at the primary level. In September 2015, a case was filed in Supreme Court of Pakistan against Government of Punjab, Pakistan as it did not take any step to implement the Punjabi language in the province. Additionally, several thousand Punjabis gather in Lahore every year on International Mother Language Day.

Hafiz Saeed, chief of Jama'at-ud-Da'wah (JuD) has questioned Pakistan's decision to adopt Urdu as its national language in a country where majority of people speak Punjabi language, citing his interpretation of Islamic doctrine as encouraging education in the mother-tongue.  Some of the organisations and activists that demand the promotion of the Punjabi language include:
 Cultural and research institutes: Punjabi Adabi Board, the Khoj Garh Research Centre, Punjabi Prachar, Institute for Peace and Secular Studies, Adbi Sangat, Khaaksaar Tehreek, Saanjh, Maan Boli Research Centre, Punjabi Sangat Pakistan, Punjabi Markaz, Sver International
 Trade unions and youth groups: Punjabi Writers Forum, National Students Federation, Punjabi Union-Pakistan, Punjabi National Conference, National Youth Forum, Punjabi Writers Forum, National Students Federation, Punjabi Union, Pakistan, and the Punjabi National Conference.
 Notable activists include Tariq Jatala, Farhad Iqbal, Diep Saeeda, Khalil Ojla, Afzal Sahir, Jamil Ahmad Paul, Mazhar Tirmazi, Mushtaq Sufi, Biya Je, Tohid Ahmad Chattha and Bilal Shaker Kahaloon, Nazeer Kahut

Notable people
List of people from Punjab, Pakistan, also includes people born in what is today Indian Punjab but moved to Pakistan after partition
List of Punjabi people, also includes people of Punjabi ethnicity from India and elsewhere

See also 

History of Punjab
 Punjab
 List of people from Punjab, Pakistan

Notes

References

Bibliography

External links

 Guide to Punjab, Pakistan

 
Provinces of Pakistan
1970 establishments in Pakistan
States and territories established in 1970
Punjabi-speaking countries and territories